The focal length of an optical system is a measure of how strongly the system converges or diverges light; it is the inverse of the system's optical power. A positive focal length indicates that a system converges light, while a negative focal length indicates that the system diverges light. A system with a shorter focal length bends the rays more sharply, bringing them to a focus in a shorter distance or diverging them more quickly. For the special case of a thin lens in air, a positive focal length is the distance over which initially collimated (parallel) rays are brought to a focus, or alternatively a negative focal length indicates how far in front of the lens a point source must be located to form a collimated beam. For more general optical systems, the focal length has no intuitive meaning; it is simply the inverse of the system's optical power.

In most photography and all telescopy, where the subject is essentially infinitely far away, longer focal length (lower optical power) leads to higher magnification and a narrower angle of view; conversely, shorter focal length or higher optical power is associated with lower magnification and a wider angle of view. On the other hand, in applications such as microscopy in which magnification is achieved by bringing the object close to the lens, a shorter focal length (higher optical power) leads to higher magnification because the subject can be brought closer to the center of projection.

Thin lens approximation 
For a thin lens in air, the focal length is the distance from the center of the lens to the principal foci (or focal points) of the lens. For a converging lens (for example a convex lens), the focal length is positive and is the distance at which a beam of collimated light will be focused to a single spot.  For a diverging lens (for example a concave lens), the focal length is negative and is the distance to the point from which a collimated beam appears to be diverging after passing through the lens.

When a lens is used to form an image of some object, the distance from the object to the lens u, the distance from the lens to the image v, and the focal length f are related by

The focal length of a thin convex lens can be easily measured by using it to form an image of a distant light source on a screen. The lens is moved until a sharp image is formed on the screen. In this case  is negligible, and the focal length is then given by 

Determining the focal length of a concave lens is somewhat more difficult.  The focal length of such a lens is considered that point at which the spreading beams of light would meet before the lens if the lens were not there.  No image is formed during such a test, and the focal length must be determined by passing light (for example, the light of a laser beam) through the lens, examining how much that light becomes dispersed/ bent, and following the beam of light backwards to the lens's focal point.

General optical systems 

For a thick lens (one which has a non-negligible thickness), or an imaging system consisting of several lenses or mirrors (e.g. a photographic lens or a telescope), there are several related concepts that are referred to as focal lengths:
Effective focal length (EFL) The effective focal length, also sometimes called equivalent focal length, is the inverse of the optical power of the optical system, and is the value used to calculate the magnification of the system. The imaging properties of the optical system can be modeled by replacing it with an ideal thin lens with the same EFL. The EFL also provides a simple method for finding the nodal points without tracing any rays.
Front focal length (FFL) The front focal length f is the distance from the front focal point F to the front principal plane H.
Rear focal length (RFL) The rear focal length f''' is the distance from the rear principal plane H' to the rear focal point F'.
Front focal distance (FFD) The front focal distance (FFD) (sF) is the distance from the front focal point of the system (F) to the vertex of the first optical surface (S1). Some authors refer to this as "front focal length".
Back focal distance (BFD) Back focal distance (BFD) (s′F′) is the distance from the vertex of the last optical surface of the system (S2) to the rear focal point (F′). Some authors refer to this as "back focal length".
	
For an optical system in air the effective focal length, front focal length, and rear focal length are all the same and may be called simply "focal length". 

For an optical system in a medium other than air or vacuum, the front and rear focal lengths are equal to the EFL times the refractive index of the medium in front of or behind the lens (n1 and n2 in the diagram above). The term "focal length" by itself is ambiguous in this case. The historical usage was to define the "focal length" as the EFL times the index of refraction of the medium. Simpson MJ, "Nodal points and the eye," Appl. Opt. 61, 2797-2804 (2022) https://doi.org/10.1364/AO.455464  For a system with different media on both sides, such as the human eye, the front and rear focal lengths are not equal to one another, and convention may dictate which one is called "the focal length" of the system. Some modern authors avoid this ambiguity by instead defining "focal length" to be a synonym for EFL. 

The distinction between front/rear focal length and EFL is important for studying the human eye. The eye can be represented by an equivalent thin lens at an air/fluid boundary with front and rear focal lengths equal to those of the eye, or it can be represented by a different equivalent thin lens that is totally in air, with focal length equal to the eye's EFL.

For the case of a lens of thickness d in air, and surfaces with radii of curvature R1 and R2, the effective focal length f is given by the Lensmaker's equation:

where n is the refractive index of the lens medium. The quantity  is also known as the optical power of the lens.

The corresponding front focal distance is:

and the back focal distance:

In the sign convention used here, the value of R1 will be positive if the first lens surface is convex, and negative if it is concave. The value of R2 is negative if the second surface is convex, and positive if concave. Note that sign conventions vary between different authors, which results in different forms of these equations depending on the convention used.

For a spherically curved mirror in air, the magnitude of the focal length is equal to the radius of curvature of the mirror divided by two. The focal length is positive for a concave mirror, and negative for a convex mirror. In the sign convention used in optical design, a concave mirror has negative radius of curvature, so

where R is the radius of curvature of the mirror's surface.

See Radius of curvature (optics) for more information on the sign convention for radius of curvature used here.

 In photography 

Camera lens focal lengths are usually specified in millimetres (mm), but some older lenses are marked in centimetres (cm) or inches.

Focal length (f) and field of view (FOV) of a lens are inversely proportional. For a standard rectilinear lens, FOV = 2 arctan , where x is the diagonal of the film.

When a photographic lens is set to "infinity", its rear principal plane is separated from the sensor or film, which is then situated at the focal plane, by the lens's focal length. Objects far away from the camera then produce sharp images on the sensor or film, which is also at the image plane.

To render closer objects in sharp focus, the lens must be adjusted to increase the distance between the rear principal plane and the film, to put the film at the image plane. The focal length (f), the distance from the front principal plane to the object to photograph (s1), and the distance from the rear principal plane to the image plane (s2) are then related by:

As s1 is decreased, s2 must be increased.  For example, consider a normal lens for a 35 mm camera with a focal length of f = 50 mm. To focus a distant object (s1 ≈ ∞), the rear principal plane of the lens must be located a distance s2 = 50 mm from the film plane, so that it is at location of the image plane. To focus an object 1 m away (s1 = 1,000 mm), the lens must be moved 2.6 mm farther away from the film plane, to s''2 = 52.6 mm.

The focal length of a lens determines the magnification at which it images distant objects.  It is equal to the distance between the image plane and a pinhole that images distant objects the same size as the lens in question.  For rectilinear lenses (that is, with no image distortion), the imaging of distant objects is well modelled as a pinhole camera model.  
This model leads to the simple geometric model that photographers use for computing the angle of view of a camera; in this case, the angle of view depends only on the ratio of focal length to film size.  In general, the angle of view depends also on the distortion.

A lens with a focal length about equal to the diagonal size of the film or sensor format is known as a normal lens; its angle of view is similar to the angle subtended by a large-enough print viewed at a typical viewing distance of the print diagonal, which therefore yields a normal perspective when viewing the print; 
this angle of view is about 53 degrees diagonally. For full-frame 35 mm-format cameras, the diagonal is 43 mm and a typical "normal" lens has a 50 mm focal length.  A lens with a focal length shorter than normal is often referred to as a wide-angle lens (typically 35 mm and less, for 35 mm-format cameras), while a lens significantly longer than normal may be referred to as a telephoto lens (typically 85 mm and more, for 35 mm-format cameras). Technically, long focal length lenses are only "telephoto" if the focal length is longer than the physical length of the lens, but the term is often used to describe any long focal length lens.

Due to the popularity of the 35 mm standard, camera–lens combinations are often described in terms of their 35 mm-equivalent focal length, that is, the focal length of a lens that would have the same angle of view, or field of view, if used on a full-frame 35 mm camera.  Use of a 35 mm-equivalent focal length is particularly common with digital cameras, which often use sensors smaller than 35 mm film, and so require correspondingly shorter focal lengths to achieve a given angle of view, by a factor known as the crop factor.

See also 
 Depth of field
 Dioptre
 f-number or focal ratio

References 

Geometrical optics
Length
Science of photography